The white-spotted wattle-eye (Platysteira tonsa) is a species of bird in the family Platysteiridae. It is found in Cameroon, Central African Republic, Republic of the Congo, Democratic Republic of the Congo, Ivory Coast, Equatorial Guinea, Gabon, and Nigeria. Its natural habitats are subtropical or tropical moist lowland forests and subtropical or tropical moist montane forests.

References

white-spotted wattle-eye
Birds of Central Africa
white-spotted wattle-eye
white-spotted wattle-eye
Taxonomy articles created by Polbot
Taxobox binomials not recognized by IUCN